Guruvamma is a 2002 Tamil-language drama film directed by Thamarai Sendhoorapandi. The film stars Livingston and Devayani, with Manivannan, Senthil, Vadivukkarasi and Pasi Sathya in a supporting role. The film was released on 19 July 2002.

Cast
Livingston as Thulasi
Devayani as Guruvamma
Manivannan
Senthil
Vadivukkarasi
Pasi Sathya
Balu Anand
Idichapuli Selvaraj
Poornitha

Soundtrack
Lyrics were written by Arivumathi and composed by Sahitya.
"Chembaruthi Poo" -
"Iyya Ethukku" -
"Koorai" -
"Megame" - Hariharan
"Odivantha Oothu" - P. Unnikrishnan
"Thoda Thoda" - Tippu

Production
Livingston and Devayani worked with each other four times in quick succession in the early 2000s, after appearances together in Parthasarathy's Unakkum Enakkum Kalyanam, Benjamin's Senthalam Poove and S. P. Rajkumar's En Purushan Kuzhandhai Maadhiri (2001) though the former two did not release despite having audio launches. Scriptwriter Yosi was also a part of the project.

Critical reception
Following the release of the film, Devayani was appreciated by critics for her performance as a street dweller. It became one of the actress's first films that she had dubbed for in her original voice. The film later won the Tamil Nadu State Film Award for Best Film Portraying Woman in Good Light for 2002.

References

2002 films
2000s Tamil-language films
Indian drama films